John Kain may refer to:
 John Kain (rugby league), English rugby league player
 John F. Kain, American economist and professor
 John Joseph Kain, American Roman Catholic archbishop

See also
 John Kane (disambiguation)
 John Cain (disambiguation)